Jack Soo (born Goro Suzuki, October 28, 1917 – January 11, 1979) was an American singer and actor. He was best known for his role as Detective Nick Yemana on the television sitcom Barney Miller.

Early life 
Soo was born Goro Suzuki on a ship traveling in the Pacific Ocean from the United States to Japan in 1917. His parents lived in Oakland, California, and they decided that as he was the oldest boy, they wanted to have him born in Japan. He graduated from University of California, Berkeley with a degree in English. He lived in Oakland until ordered into internment along with other Japanese Americans during World War II and the signing of Executive Order 9066. He was sent to the Topaz War Relocation Center in Utah.  His fellow internees recalled him as a "camp favorite," an entertainer singing at dances and numerous events.

Soo's career as an entertainer began in earnest at the end of the war, first as a stand-up nightclub performer primarily in the Midwestern United States. He changed his name to Jack Soo while working at a Chinese night club called Chin's in Cleveland to avoid prejudice against him as a Japanese-American.

During his years playing the nightclub circuit, he met and became friends with future Barney Miller producer Danny Arnold, who was also a performer at the time.

Career

Soo finally earned his big break in 1958 when he was cast in the Broadway musical hit Flower Drum Song in the role of the show master of ceremonies and comedian Frankie Wing ("Gliding through my memoree"). He was working in San Francisco at the Forbidden City, a Chinese nightclub and cabaret, where he was discovered by the dancer-director of Flower Drum Song, Gene Kelly. He was offered the chance to go to Broadway on the condition that he change his name to something Chinese, as Flower Drum Song is set in San Francisco's Chinatown. At that time, he adopted the surname that he had used to leave the internment camp at Topaz, "Soo". Soo switched to the Sammy Fong role (Chinatown's "Nathan Detroit") during the run and played the role when the film version (1961) of the musical was made.

Soo was first broadcast across America by Jack Benny on November 27, 1962, as the tough-talking, street-wise talent agent in "Jack Meets Japanese Agent". In 1964, Soo played a weekly supporting role as Rocky Sin, a poker-playing con artist in Valentine's Day, a comedy television series starring Anthony Franciosa that lasted for one season. During the next decade, he  appeared in films such The Green Berets as a colonel of the Army of the Republic of Vietnam and the 1967 musical Thoroughly Modern Millie, as well as making guest appearances on TV shows such as Hawaii Five-O, The Odd Couple, and two episodes of M*A*S*H.

Soo joined Motown Records in 1965 as one of their first non-African-American artists. During his time there, he recorded a slow ballad version of "For Once in My Life" as the first male singer to do so. The record was never released and was shelved in the Motown archives. The song was soon after made famous by Stevie Wonder.<ref name="jsstory" Soo was cast in his most memorable role in 1975 on the ABC sitcom Barney Miller as the laid-back, but very wry, Detective Nick Yemana, who was responsible for making the dreadful coffee that, in one of the series' running jokes, his fellow detectives had to drink every day.  Occasionally, his character played against stereotypes of Asian Americans by emphasizing Yemana's solidly American background. Soo also refused to perform in roles that were demeaning to Asian Americans. He often spoke out against negative ethnic portrayals, and was adamant about being a person who was seen as an American.

Personal life 
Soo was married to Jan Zdelar, a model. The couple had three children and two grandchildren.

Death

Soo, a smoker, was diagnosed with esophageal cancer during Barney Millers fourth season (1977–1978), missing the last five episodes. He returned for the opening of season five, but the cancer spread quickly, and Soo died on January 11, 1979, at age 61, at the University of California at Los Angeles Medical Center (now the Ronald Reagan UCLA Medical Center). His last appearance on the show was in the episode entitled "The Vandal", which aired on November 9, 1978.

A running joke on the show was that Yemana made bad coffee. "It must have been my coffee," Soo joked when he was being wheeled into surgery. A retrospective episode showing clips of Soo aired at the end of the season, which concluded with the cast members raising their coffee cups in a final farewell toast to him.

Filmography

References

External links

 SFIAAFF 2009: You Don't Know Jack (The Jack Soo Story) — Interview With Jeff Adachi
 You Don't Know Jack: The Jack Soo Story (2009)
 
 
 

1917 births
1979 deaths
People born at sea
20th-century American male actors
Japanese-American internees
Male actors from Oakland, California
Deaths from esophageal cancer
Deaths from cancer in California
American male actors of Japanese descent
American singers of Asian descent
American male singers
Burials at Forest Lawn Memorial Park (Hollywood Hills)
University of California, Berkeley alumni